Idalus veneta is a moth of the subfamily Arctiinae. It was described by Paul Dognin in 1901. It is found in Colombia and Venezuela.

References

 Natural History Museum Lepidoptera generic names catalog

veneta
Moths described in 1901